Clovis Renaison (born 24 October 1892 in Le Moule, Guadeloupe; died 14 November 1989 in Les Abymes) was a politician from Guadeloupe who served in the French Senate from 1946-1948 .

References

External links
French Senate website

1892 births
1989 deaths
People from Le Moule
Guadeloupean politicians
French Section of the Workers' International politicians
French Senators of the Fourth Republic
Senators of Guadeloupe